In the early morning hours of March 26, 2017, a shootout occurred at the Cameo nightclub in southeastern Cincinnati, Ohio. One person was killed and 16 others were injured. Two suspects were arrested on March 30, though police continued to search for more people involved. One of the suspects, who was among those injured, later died of his injuries on April 4.

Club 
The club itself is a large single-story structure, located directly to the west of the Cincinnati Municipal Lunken Airport,  from downtown Cincinnati near the southeast corner of the city. It was previously called Club Cameo, and before that, a gay club known as Adonis. The club maintains a high security profile, usually posting two off-duty police officers at the front door and two in their parking lot.

Events
The shootout occurred around 1:30 a.m. EDT at Cameo nightclub.

Hundreds of people were in the nightclub when the shooting began, with officers describing the crime scene as "chaotic".

Victims 
Several of the injured drove themselves to area hospitals, and some had sustained life-threatening injuries, according to police officials. Eight victims were taken to University of Cincinnati Medical Center, one of whom was in critical condition. Of the remaining, three were seriously injured, and four were stable. Two additional victims were taken to The Christ Hospital with minor injuries. Others were treated at Bethesda North Hospital, Mercy West Hospital and Anderson Mercy Hospital. Officers at the scene attempted to administer CPR to the person who died.

One of the wounded was arrested as a suspect. The suspect died from his wounds on April 4, 2017.

Investigation 

The event was initially believed to be a mass shooting. On March 27, 2017, however, Chief Isaac stated that the shooting occurred after several local men who were patrons at the club got into an argument, which later escalated into a shootout between them.

Aftermath
The operator of the Cameo club Julian Rodgers announced on March 27, 2017, that the club would officially be shutting down that following Friday, after its landlord issued a notice to vacate the premises. He also surrendered the club's liquor license during the day. The club had been cited numerous times for violations in the past.

Two suspects were arrested on March 30, 2017 and were charged with murder. One of the suspects had been wounded in the shooting and was in critical condition, and would succumb to his injuries on April 4, 2017. Isaac stated that they had evidence that other people were involved as well. Authorities stated that they had found three guns and were seeking an unidentified suspect.

In December 2018, the surviving suspect, Cornell Beckley, was sentenced to 19 years in prison after pleading guilty to 10 charges, including one count of involuntary manslaughter and four counts of felonious assault. He also pleaded guilty to tampering with evidence, obstruction of justice, an bribery for attempting to pay off witnesses. The two people killed in the shooting were O'Bryan Spikes and Deondre Davis. Davis was charged with Spikes's murder, but later died at University of Cincinnati Medical Center.

References 

2017 in Ohio
2017 murders in the United States
Attacks in the United States in 2017
Attacks on nightclubs
Crimes in Cincinnati
Deaths by firearm in Ohio
March 2017 events in the United States
2017 mass shootings in the United States
Mass shootings in Ohio